1467 Mashona, provisional designation , is a rare-type carbonaceous asteroid from the outer regions of the asteroid belt, approximately 100 kilometers in diameter, making it one of the top 200 largest asteroids currently known to exist. It was discovered on 30 July 1938, by South African astronomer Cyril Jackson at the Johannesburg Observatory in South Africa. It was later named after the native Shona people of Zimbabwe.

Classification and orbit 

Mashona orbits the Sun in the outer main-belt at a distance of 2.9–3.8 AU once every 6 years and 3 months (2,277 days). Its orbit has an eccentricity of 0.13 and an inclination of 22° with respect to the ecliptic. It is a member of the Cybele asteroid group.

The body's observation arc begins at Johannesburg, 5 days after its official discovery observation.

Mashona was the highest numbered asteroid used in calculating the future orbit of 101955 Bennu.

Physical characteristics 

In the Tholen classification, Mashona is a rare GC-type, a spectral type that transitions between the common C and rare G-type asteroids.

Lightcurves 

Until April 2010, three rotational lightcurves of Mashona have been obtained from photometric observations. Lightcurve analysis gave a well-defined rotation period between 9.74 and 9.76 hours with a brightness amplitude varying from 0.24 to 0.31 magnitude.

Diameter and albedo 

According to the surveys carried out by the Japanese Akari satellite and NASA's Wide-field Infrared Survey Explorer with its subsequent NEOWISE mission, Mashona measures between 89.160 and 104.119 kilometers in diameter and its surface has an albedo between 0.05 and 0.083. The Collaborative Asteroid Lightcurve Link assumes a standard albedo for carbonaceous asteroids of 0.057 and calculates a diameter of 107.54 kilometers based on an absolute magnitude of 8.57. Among nearly half a million asteroids, Mashona belongs to the 200 largest bodies.

Naming 

This minor planet was named for the Shona people (Mashona), natives of Mashonaland in Zimbabwe, then Rhodesia. The official  was published by the Minor Planet Center in April 1953.

References

External links 
 Asteroid Lightcurve Database (LCDB), query form (info )
 Dictionary of Minor Planet Names, Google books
 Asteroids and comets rotation curves, CdR – Observatoire de Genève, Raoul Behrend
 Discovery Circumstances: Numbered Minor Planets (1)-(5000) – Minor Planet Center
 
 

 

001467
Discoveries by Cyril Jackson (astronomer)
Named minor planets
001467
19380730